Berstett is a commune in the Bas-Rhin department in Grand Est in northeastern France.

In 1972, the communes of Berstett, Gimbrett, Reitwiller (German: Reitweiler) and Rumersheim were merged into the present commune.

Population

See also
Communes of the Bas-Rhin department
Kochersberg

References

External links

Official site

Communes of Bas-Rhin